Roman Line (foaled 1959) was an American Thoroughbred racehorse. Trained by Tennessee Wright, the colt won the 1962 Derby Trial Stakes by six lengths at Churchill Downs then in U.S. Triple Crown series finished second by a neck in record time to Decidedly in the Kentucky Derby and third to Greek Money in the Preakness Stakes.

Roman Line's racing career was cut short by a training injury at Monmouth Park Racetrack on June 11, 1962. Retired to stud duty he met with reasonable success as the sire of a number of race/stakes winners.

References

 Roman Line's pedigree and partial racing stats

1959 racehorse births
Racehorses bred in Kentucky
Racehorses trained in the United States
Thoroughbred family 7-e